Jonathan Woodhouse (born 1987) is an English actor, director and producer.

Woodhouse was born in London and attended school and college in the London Borough of Newham. He is of English and Filipino descent. He studied for a Master of Arts in Theatre at Royal Holloway, University of London before founding Encompass Productions, an artistic production company. He directed and produced Encompass' first major project 'What It Feels Like', a new play that premiered at the 2011 Edinburgh Fringe festival to critical acclaim. His first major acting role was in the film The Lady directed by Luc Besson, playing 'Alexander Aris', the eldest son of Burmese opposition leader Aung San Suu Kyi (played by Michelle Yeoh) and Michael Aris (David Thewlis). He is currently working in London on a number of theatre and short film projects.

Filmography

Film

Theatre

External links
 
 'The Lady'
 Encompass Productions
 'What It Feels Like'
 'What It Feels Like' Ed Fringe Review 
 'What It Feels Like' Fringe Guru Review

References

1987 births
Living people
British male actors of Asian descent
English male television actors
English male film actors
English male stage actors
English male radio actors
English male voice actors
English people of Filipino descent
Male actors from London